Jann Arden Live with the Vancouver Symphony Orchestra is a 2002 live album by Jann Arden, recorded in conjunction with the Vancouver Symphony Orchestra.

Track listing
"Could I Be Your Girl?" (Arden)
"Waiting in Canada" (Arden, Broom)
"You Don't Know Me" (Arnold, Walker)
"The Sound Of" (Arden)
"Mend" (Arden, Broom)
"I Would Die for You" (Arden)
"Saved" (Richards, Vanston)
"Sorry for Myself" (Arden, Broom)
"Never Mind" (Arden)
"Good Mother" (Arden, Foster)
"Make It Christmas Day" (Arden)

Jann Arden albums
2002 live albums
Collaborative albums